Drake Anthony, known online as Styropyro, is an American YouTuber.

History 
Anthony, born on August 20, 1992, grew up in Goodfield, Illinois. Anthony began experimenting with lasers at the age of 12 after learning about them in school, and began posting on YouTube in 2006. He attended Southern Illinois University where he obtained a bachelor's degree in chemistry.

Content 
Anthony has demonstrated levitating particles using lasers, very powerful lasers, and building his own lasers.

References

External links 
 

American YouTubers
Living people
YouTube channels launched in 2006
1992 births